9-Methyl-β-carboline (9-Me-BC) is a heterocyclic amine of the β-carboline family, and a research chemical.

Chemistry
9-Me-BC is a methylated derivative of β-carboline with the molecular formula C12H10N2.

It may be prepared by performing the Eschweiler–Clarke reaction on freebase β-carboline (norharmane)

Biological effects
In vitro studies with dopaminergic neuron cell cultures demonstrated increased expression of tyrosine hydroxylase and associated transcription factors, increased neurite outgrowth, regeneration of neurons after chronic rotenone administration, and reduced expression of inflammatory cytokines.  In studies of primary mesencephalic dopaminergic neuron cell cultures, the substance increased the number of differentiated dopaminergic neurons and produced higher levels of transcription factors associated with dopaminergic differentiation.  9-Me-BC also inhibited the oxidation of the neurotoxin precursor MPTP to the dopaminergic neurotoxin MPP+ in vitro.

Rodent studies in vivo demonstrated elevated hippocampal dopamine levels, improved spatial learning performance in a radial maze test, and increased dendrite outgrowth in the dentate gyrus of the hippocampus, as well as restoration of the number of tyrosine hydroxylase expressing neurons in the left striatum after an injection of MPP+ had reduced the number of such cells by 50% in an animal model of Parkinsonism.

9-Me-BC is a known inhibitor of monoamine oxidase A and monoamine oxidase B, and has been proposed for further investigation in the treatment of Parkinson's disease.

It may possess photosensitizing effects.

See also 
 Harmane
 Gacyclidine

References 

Beta-Carbolines
Monoamine oxidase inhibitors
Experimental drugs